My Wife is an Actress is a 2001 French romantic comedy-drama film starring Yvan Attal and Charlotte Gainsbourg. Attal plays a journalist who becomes obsessively jealous when his actress wife gets a part in a movie with an attractive co-star. Attal also wrote and directed the film. The film stars Terence Stamp among others. This film is also highly biographic, as Yvan and Charlotte are a real-life couple since 1991, and have three children. According to Yvan, the idea and a part of the plot originates from real-life events.

Cast
 Charlotte Gainsbourg as Charlotte
 Yvan Attal as Yvan
 Terence Stamp as John
 Noémie Lvovsky as Nathalie
 Laurent Bateau as Vincent
 Keith Allen as David
 Ludivine Sagnier as Géraldine
 Lionel Abelanski as Georges
 Marie Denarnaud as Colette
 Gilles Lellouche as The policeman
 Eriq Ebouaney as The Club bouncer

Reception
The film was released on 14 November 2001 in France on 238 screens and opened at number one with a gross of 7 million Francs ($1 million) for the week. It went on to gross $3.4 million in France. It opened on 12 July 2002 in 7 theatres in the United States and grossed $49,204 in the opening weekend and went on to gross $1,121,233. It grossed $5,169,438 worldwide.

References

External links
 

 

2001 films
2001 romantic comedy-drama films
Films about actors
Films directed by Yvan Attal
2000s French-language films
Films shot at Pinewood Studios
Films produced by Claude Berri
French romantic comedy-drama films
Sony Pictures Classics films
2000s French films